Ephraim Laurence Palmer (July 8, 1888 – December 18, 1970) was an American science educator and conservationist. He served as president of several national organizations, including: the National Council of Supervisors of Nature Study and Gardening; American Nature Study Society; Department of Science Instruction of the National Education Association (now National Science Teachers Association); and the National Association of Biology Teachers. He was director of the National Audubon Society (1946-1950) and director of Conservation Education of the National Wildlife Federation (1950-1956).  He directed nature programs for the Boy Scouts of America for over 30 years, and was awarded the Silver Beaver and Silver Buffalo Awards for his service. He edited the Cornell Rural School Leaflet for 34 years, and was elected Fellow of the American Association for the Advancement of Science and the Rochester Academy of Science. He was known for books such as Field Book of Natural History (1949), the weekly radio show This Week in Nature of the 1940s and 1950s, and his writings in Nature Magazine.

Palmer was born in McGraw, New York, on July 8, 1888, to Laura Lincoln (née Darrow) and Ephraim Clark Palmer.  He attended Cortland State Normal School, and in 1908 enrolled in Cornell University, graduating with an A.B. in 1911 and M.A. in 1913. He taught at Iowa State Teachers College before returning to Cornell to earn a PhD in systematic botany in 1917. In 1921 he married Katherine Van Winkle, a paleontologist.

Books
 Camp Fire Nature Guide, Slingerland-Comstock Publishing Company, 1925.
 The Field Book of Nature Study, Slingerland-Comstock Publishing Company, 1925 and revised 1928.
 The Nature Almanac (with Arthur Newton Pack), American Nature Association, 1927, 1930.
 Nature Magazine’s Guide to Science Teaching, American Nature Association, 1936.
 Fieldbook of Mammals, E. P. Dutton and Company, 1957
 Fossils, Heath and Company, 1965

References

External links

Guide to the Katherine V. W. Palmer and Ephraim Laurence Palmer Memorabilia, 1918-1978 at Cornell University Library
Cornell Rural School Leaflet archives at HathiTrust Digital Library

1888 births
1970 deaths
American education writers
People from Cortland County, New York
Cornell University alumni
American conservationists
Fellows of the American Association for the Advancement of Science
Scientists from New York (state)